Gerard Endenburg (born 1933) is a Dutch entrepreneur, who developed the Sociocratic Circle Organisation Method (SCM), which is a decision-making method for governing and managing organizations and societies based on equivalence and draws inspiration from cybernetics. Endenburg was inspired by the idea of sociocracy of Kees Boeke.

Biography
Endenburg was born in Rotterdam in 1933. He was a Quaker, and attended a Quaker boarding school, the  [Children's Community Workshop], where he was influenced by Kees Boeke and his wife Betty Cadbury and the ideas of sociocracy. The school involved students in consensus decision-making.

He became general manager of his family's engineering company, Endenburg Elektrotechniek BV, in the mid-1960s, and in the 1970s started pioneering and applying the sociocratic method of organizing within the company. In 1978, Endenburg founded the Sociocratic Center Netherlands to develop and implement the sociocratic approach in other organizations, serving as its director. In 1992, Endenburg obtained a doctoral degree from the University of Twente, based on his dissertation Sociocratie als Sociaal Ontwerp, translated into English as Sociocracy as Social Design. Endenburg was an honorary professor in Organizational Learning at Maastricht University.

Bibliography

See also 
Double linking
Thesis circle

References

1933 births
Businesspeople from Rotterdam
Living people
University of Twente alumni